The 2017 Rugby League World Cup Asia-Pacific qualification play-off was a rugby league match that was played on 17 October 2015 at Campbelltown Stadium in Australia. Tonga defeated the Cook Islands 28–8 to qualify for the 2017 Rugby League World Cup.

Overview 
On 3 October 2014, the 2017 Rugby League World Cup qualifying competition was announced. Seven of the eight teams who made the knockout-stages of the 2013 Rugby League World Cup were announced as automatic qualifiers, which included New Zealand, Australia, Samoa and Fiji.

In October 2015, Papua New Guinea was announced a co-host of the 2017 World Cup and granted automatic qualification. It was confirmed that Tonga would take on the Cook Islands in a one-off game for the 2017 World Cup with the playing date later being confirmed as 17 October 2015. The game was held at Campbelltown Stadium in Campbelltown, Australia.

Squads 
Both teams picked preliminary train-on squads that had NRL and Super League experience.

Tonga
The Tongan squad as of 24 September 2015 is as follows:

Coach:  Kristian Woolf

Cook Islands
The Cook Islands squad as of 24 September 2015 is as follows:

Coach:  Alex Chan

Qualifier
Tonga picked 4 débutantes, while the Cook Islands featured eleven. The Tongan team consisted of National Rugby League based players except for Mosese Pangai and Ukuma Ta’ai, who play in the Queensland Cup for the Townsville Blackhawks and the Super League for the Huddersfield Giants respectively. The Cook Islands team consisted mainly of players who play at reserve grade or youth levels for their respective NRL clubs, only 4 players in the lineup have played first grade this season either in the NRL or in the Super League. Tonga's most capped player is Ukuma Ta’ai who made his 8th appearance for his country, while the Cook Islands' most experienced players are Drury Low, Anthony Gelling and Johnathon Ford who all made their 6th appearance for their nation.

Penrith's Sika Manu captained Tonga, and Canberra's Jordan Rapana led the Cook Islands.

Match details

With the win, Tonga qualified for the 2017 World Cup.

References 

2015 in rugby league
2017 Rugby League World Cup
2015 in Tongan sport
2015 in Cook Islands sport